James Allen Taylor (born December 31, 1937) is a retired United States Army officer and a recipient of the United States military's highest decoration—the Medal of Honor—for his actions in the Vietnam War.

Military career
Taylor joined the United States Army from San Francisco, California, in 1956 and was commissioned as an officer in 1965. By November 8, 1967, he was serving as a first lieutenant in Troop B, 1st Squadron, 1st Cavalry Regiment, Americal Division. When his commander was wounded in action, Taylor was ordered into the combat zone to take command and prepare a search-and-destroy mission. During a battle the next day, west of Que Son in the Republic of Vietnam, Taylor repeatedly exposed himself to enemy fire to rescue crewmen from damaged assault vehicles and personnel carriers. He was subsequently promoted to captain and awarded the Medal of Honor on November 19, 1968.

Taylor reached the rank of major before retiring from the army in 1980. He holds a bachelor's degree in criminology from the University of Tampa.

Medal of Honor citation

Taylor's official Medal of Honor citation reads:

See also

List of Medal of Honor recipients for the Vietnam War

References

External links

1937 births
Living people
People from Arcata, California
Military personnel from California
United States Army personnel of the Vietnam War
United States Army Medal of Honor recipients
United States Army officers
Vietnam War recipients of the Medal of Honor